Peter Paul Pasko (September 9, 1919 – March 31, 2004) was an American professional basketball player. He played for the Oshkosh All-Stars in the National Basketball League for two seasons and averaged 6.1 points per game. Pasko's professional basketball career also led him to teams in the Professional Basketball League of America, American Basketball League, and the Eastern Basketball Association. In college, he played football, basketball, baseball, and track and field for East Stroudsburg University.

References

1919 births
2004 deaths
American men's basketball players
Basketball players from Pennsylvania
College men's track and field athletes in the United States
Forwards (basketball)
East Stroudsburg Warriors baseball players
East Stroudsburg Warriors football players
East Stroudsburg Warriors men's basketball players
Junior college men's basketball coaches in the United States
Oshkosh All-Stars players
Professional Basketball League of America players
Wilkes-Barre Barons players